The ice hockey team rosters at the 1994 Winter Olympics consisted of the following players:

Austria
Jim Burton, Marty Dallman, Claus Dalpiaz, Rob Doyle, Michael Güntner, Karl Heinzle, Herbert Hohenberger, Dieter Kalt, Werner Kerth, Martin Krainz, Wolfgang Kromp, Günther Lanzinger, Engelbert Linder, Manfred Mühr, Rick Nasheim, Michael Puschacher, Andreas Pusnik, Gerhard Pusnik, Gerald Ressmann, Mike Shea, Brian Stankiewicz, Ken Strong, Martin Ulrich

Canada
Mark Astley, Adrian Aucoin, David Harlock, Corey Hirsch, Todd Hlushko, Greg Johnson, Fabian Joseph, Paul Kariya, Chris Kontos, Manny Legace, Ken Lovsin, Derek Mayer, Petr Nedved, Dwayne Norris, Greg Parks, Allain Roy, Jean-Yves Roy, Brian Savage, Brad Schlegel, Wally Schreiber, Chris Therien, Todd Warriner, Brad Werenka

Czech Republic
Jan Alinč, Petr Bříza, Jiří Doležal, Pavel Geffert, Roman Horák, Miloslav Hořava, Martin Hosták, Petr Hrbek, Otakar Janecký, Drahomír Kadlec, Tomáš Kapusta, Kamil Kašťák, Jiří Kučera, Bedřich Ščerban, Tomáš Sršeň, Antonín Stavjaňa, Radek Ťoupal, Roman Turek, Jiří Veber, Jan Vopat, Jiří Vykoukal, Richard Žemlička

Finland
Mika Alatalo, Erik Hämäläinen, Raimo Helminen, Timo Jutila, Sami Kapanen, Esa Keskinen, Marko Kiprusoff, Saku Koivu, Pasi Kuivalainen, Janne Laukkanen, Tero Lehterä, Jere Lehtinen, Jarmo Myllys, Mika Nieminen, Janne Ojanen, Marko Palo, Ville Peltonen, Pasi Sormunen, Mika Strömberg, Jukka Tammi, Petri Varis, Hannu Virta

France
Benjamin Agnel, Stéphane Arcangeloni, Stéphane Botteri, Arnaud Briand, Sylvain Girard, Gérald Guennelon, Benoit Laporte, Eric Lemarque, Pierrick Maïa, Christophe Moyon, Franck Pajonkowski, Denis Perez, Serge Poudrier, Pierre Pousse, Antoine Richer, Bruno Saunier, Franck Saunier, Michel Valliere, Christophe Ville, Steven Woodburn, Petri Ylönen,

Germany
Rick Amann, Jan Benda, Thomas Brandl, Helmut de Raaf, Benoît Doucet, Georg Franz, Jörg Handrick, Dieter Hegen, Josef Heiß, Uli Hiemer, Raimund Hilger, Torsten Kienass, Wolfgang Kummer, Mirko Lüdemann, Jörg Mayr, Klaus Merk, Jason Meyer, Andreas Niederberger, Michael Rumrich, Alexander Serikow, Leo Stefan, Bernd Truntschka, Stefan Ustorf

Italy
Patrick Brugnoli, Jim Camazzola, Bruno Campese, Toni Circelli, Luigi Da Corte, Michael De Angelis, David Delfino, Lino De Toni, Stephan Figliuzzi, Phil Di Gaetano, Alexander Gschliesser, Leo Insam, Emilio Iovio, Maurizio Mansi, Robert Oberrauch, Gaetano Orlando, Martin Pavlu, Roland Ramoser, Mike Rosati, Vezio Sacratini, Bill Stewart, Lucio Topatigh, Bruno Zarrillo

Norway
Cato Tom Andersen, Lars Håkon Andersen, Vegar Barlie, Arne Billkvam, Svenn Erik Bjørnstad, Ole Eskild Dahlstrøm, Jan-Roar Fagerli, Geir Hoff, Tommy Jakobsen, Roy Johansen, Tom Johansen, Espen Knutsen, Erik Kristiansen, Trond Magnussen, Jim Marthinsen, Svein Enok Nørstebø, Marius Rath, Petter Salsten, Rob Schistad, Petter Thoresen

Russia
Sergei Abramov,  Sergei Berezin, Vyacheslav Bezukladnikov, Oleg Davydov, Dmitry Denisov, Ravil Gusmanov, Valery Ivannikov, Igor Ivanov, Valeri Karpov, Alexei Kudashov, Andrei Nikolishin, Oleg Shargordsky, Sergei Shendelev, Alexander Smirnov, Sergei Sorokin, Andrei Tarasenko, Vladimir Tarasov, Sergey Tertyshny, Pavel Torgayev, Igor Varitsky, Aleksandr Vinogradov, Georgy Yevtyukhin, Andrei Zuyev

Slovakia
Jerguš Bača, Vladimír Búřil, Jozef Daňo, Jaromír Dragan, Eduard Hartman, Oto Haščák, Branislav Jánoš, Ľubomír Kolník, Roman Kontšek, Miroslav Marcinko, Stanislav Medřik, Miroslav Michalek, Žigmund Pálffy, Róbert Petrovický, Vlastimil Plavucha, Dušan Pohoreleč, René Pucher, Miroslav Šatan, Ľubomír Sekeráš, Marián Smerčiak, Peter Šťastný, Róbert Švehla, Ján Varholík

Sweden
Håkan Algotsson, Charles Berglund, Jonas Bergqvist, Andreas Dackell, Christian Due-Boje, Niklas Eriksson, Peter Forsberg, Roger Hansson, Roger Johansson, Jörgen Jönsson, Kenny Jönsson, Tomas Jonsson, Patrik Juhlin, Patric Kjellberg, Håkan Loob, Mats Näslund, Stefan Örnskog, Leif Rohlin, Daniel Rydmark, Tommy Salo, Fredrik Stillman, Magnus Svensson

United States
Mark Beaufait, Jim Campbell, Peter Ciavaglia, Ted Crowley, Ted Drury, Mike Dunham, Peter Ferraro, Brett Hauer, Darby Hendrickson, Chris Imes, Craig Johnson, Peter Laviolette, Jeff Lazaro, John Lilley, Todd Marchant, Matt Martin, Travis Richards, Barry Richter, David Roberts, Brian Rolston, David Sacco, Garth Snow

References

Sources

Hockey Hall Of Fame page on the 1994 Olympics

rosters
1994